Water War can refer to:
 
 Water conflict, a war waged over water resources
 Water fight, when people use water to splash at each other
 Naval warfare, when war takes place not on  land but on the water

See also
 War over Water (disambiguation)